The Temple Mount, a holy site in the Old City of Jerusalem, also known as the al-Ḥaram al-Sharīf and the al-Aqsa Mosque compound, contains twelve gates. One of the gates, Bab as-Sarai, is currently closed to the public but was open under Ottoman rule. There are also six other sealed gates. This does not include the Gates of the Old City of Jerusalem which circumscribe the external walls except on the east side.

List of openable gates 
The following is an anti-clockwise list of gates which open onto the Al-Aqsa Compound. Currently eleven gates are open to the Muslim public. Non-Muslims are only permitted to enter through the Moroccan (or Magharibah) gate. The keys to all the gates, with the exception of the Moroccan gate are held by the Islamic Waqf; but they can only open or close gates with the permission of Israel.

Gate of the Tribes (Bab al-Asbat)

The Gate of the Tribes is located at the north-eastern corner of the compound. Its name refers to the Twelve Tribes of Israel ("Bani Isra'il") who left Egypt and came to the Holy Land/Bayt al-Maqdis to find the Promised Land. Bab al-Asbāt is located to the east of the short northern side of the compound. Behind the gate, there is also a road as the Lions' Gate in the old city (also known as St Stephen's Gate).

Asbāt gate is one of the important ancient gates and the gate names had been given by Ibn al Fakih and Ibn Abd' Rabbih two earliest authorities. The Asbāt gate was first built by the Mamluk Ruler Bybars. Later, the door was renewed by Sultan Süleyman I during the Ottoman period. According to a legend, Sultan Suleyman I, who had a bad dream, is claimed to have started to renew the walls of Jerusalem (Beit el-Maqdis) after this dream.

The Asbāt gate is located on the northern wall of the Haram al-Sharif and it is in the double gateway also, it is almost directly opposite Ahwab Mihrab Mariam. The entrance to the gate is impressively decorated. There has the single opening of a semicircular arch with a distinctive 45-degree chamfer and segmental inner arch at the part of the gate that has reached the present time, also the masonry of the wall shows that there are two gates because 1.20 meters of the gate wall reaches to the west side. According to Ratrout, the Early Muslim architecture of Bab al-Asbāt and its dimensions coincide with those of Bab al-Hashmi. Bab al-Asbāt is 2.81 meters in the width of the doorway, 3.30 meters in the width of the inner threshold of the doorway, and 4.30 meters in height of its arch. Due to its level with the ground, this gate is the only gate through which ambulances can enter the mosque in case of emergency.

Gate of Remission (Bab al-Hitta)

The Gate of Remission, where 'remission' means 'forgiveness', is located on the north side. It is one of the oldest gates of the Al-Aqsa compound, and is the main entrance for visitors entering from the northern side of the city of Jerusalem (al-Quds), including the neighborhood of Bab Huta.

Gate of Darkness (Bab al-Atim)

The Gate of Darkness (  or ) is one of the three gates located on the north side. It was called "Gate of al-Dawadariya", after a nearby school. It is now also known as King Faisal's Gate. The gate is four meters tall, with an arched roof. At least a couple renovations are known, once circa 1213, during the reign of Ayyubid King al-Mu'azzam Isa, and then circa 1930 by King Faisal of Saudi Arabia. It is one of the three gates on the north. The gate is also known as the "Gate of Honor of the Prophets".

Gate of the Bani Ghānim (Bab al-Ghawanima)
The Gate of the Bani Ghānim is located on the north-western corner. It was called the al-Khalil gate.

Gate of the Seraglio or Palace (Bab as-Sarai; closed)
A twelfth gate still open during Ottoman rule is now closed to the public: Bab as-Sarai (Gate of the Seraglio, or of the Palace); a small gate to the former residence of the Pasha of Jerusalem; in the northern part of the western wall, between the Bani Ghānim and Council Gates.

Council Gate (Bab al-Majlis)

The Council Gate, also known as the Inspector's Gate ( or ), is located on the northern side of the western Temple Mount wall.

Iron Gate (Bab al-Hadid)

The Iron Gate is located on the western side, at the end of Bab al-Hadid Street, being within the Muslim Quarter, and where, before entering, one gains access to an exposed and contiguous section of the ancient wall of the Temple Mount, known locally as the Little Western Wall.

Cotton Merchants' Gate (Bab al-Qattanin)

The Cotton Merchants' Gate leads onto the Temple Mount. It was built by the ruler of Damascus, Tankiz, during the reign of Mamluk Sultan ibn Qalawun, as marked by an inscription over the door. Since this site is the closest a person can get to the Foundation Stone without setting foot on the mount itself, the gate was a popular place of prayer for Jews during the 19th century.

Ablution Gate (Bab al-Matahara)

The gate is rectangular in shape and reaches a height of 3.5 m. It was renovated during the reign of the Mamluk Prince Alaa al-Din al-Busairi in the year 666 AH (1266 CE). It is the only gate that does not lead to the streets and alleys of the Old City, but to a private road that leads to al-Mutahara, located 50 meters away from it.

The Waqf (Islamic Endowments) Department in Jerusalem, which is in charge of managing the affairs of the Al-Aqsa Mosque, rebuilt it in the 1980s.

Tranquility Gate (Bab as-Salam)
The Tranquility Gate ( or ) is the closed, twin gate of the Chain Gate.

Chain Gate (Bab as-Silsila)

The Chain Gate is located on the western flank. Though not without dispute, some think that this was the site of the Kipunos (Coponius) Gate, which existed during the Second Temple period.

Magharibah Gate

The Moors' Gate, also known as Magharibah Gate, is the southernmost gate on the western flank of the compound, built directly over the Herodian-period gate known as the Gate of the Prophet (also known as Barclay's Gate, named for James Turner Barclay). It is believed that the current gate was built during the Ayyubid period and renovated and connected to the western section of the compound during Mamluke rule. The gate was constructed around the time that the Ayyubids endowed the quarter to North Africans and Moors of Andalusia, Malikites, who were living side by side in Jerusalem. The Magharibah, as these communities were called in Arabic, lived in this area until they were dispersed with the quarter’s demolition in 1967 by Israel in order to construct the Western Wall Plaza for the Jews to pray. Some 130 homes were destroyed, displacing the North African inhabitants who came and settled in the area since the time of Saladin. 

Over the years, the ground level outside the Magharibah Gate rose by many meters above its threshold and the Gate of the Prophet (Barclay's Gate) was finally walled up in the 10th century. At some stage, a new gate called Bab al-Magharibah was installed in al-Buraq Wall (Western Wall) above the Gate of the Prophet (Barclay's Gate), at the level of the compound esplanade. It was named after the residents of the adjacent neighborhood, who had come to Jerusalem from the Maghreb in the days of Saladin. This gate is open to this day and since 1967 has been the entrance to the Al-Aqsa Mosque accessible to non-Muslims only. Muslims have been banned from using this gate since 1967. 

Although the keys to the Al-Aqsa compound gates are the property of the Islamic Waqf organization, the keys to the al-Magharibah gate were seized by the Israel in 1967 and continue to remain in their possession until today.

The gate, specifically the excavation of the historic ramp leading up to it, has been a point of contention between Israelis and Arab Muslims. In February 2004, a wall which supported the 800-year-old ramp jutting out from al-Buraq Wall (Western Wall) and leading up to the Maghariba Gate, partially collapsed. Israeli authorities believed a recent earthquake and snowfall may have been responsible, while Hamas and Muslim officials blamed the collapse on Israelis working in the area. The Maghariba Gate is the only access for non-Muslims to enter the site, meaning its closure will prevent both Jews and tourists from visiting until a replacement structure is built.
The ramp leads from the plaza by the Western Wall up to the adjoining compound, known to Muslims as Haram al-Sharif, which houses the Al-Aqsa Mosque, the third holiest site in Islam. It is known that Israel has been carrying out archaeological excavations in an area outside the compound, inviting the charge that they are trying to destabilise the mosque, Islam's third holiest site. In 2007, the Israel Antiquities Authority (IAA) built a temporary wooden pedestrian bridge to the Maghariba Gate. No agreement could be reached over a more permanent structure.

The damaged ramp, situated beneath the bridge and not connected to it, consists of an accumulation of archaeological layers which have been excavated by the IAA, who removed surface material and made visible several ruined structures. This was done in contravention to the action plan initially submitted by the IAA to the UNESCO.

In 2013, an archaeological excavation was conducted at the Maghariba Gate by Hayim-Her Barbe, Roie Greenvald, and Yevgeni Kagan, on behalf of the Israel Antiquities Authority (IAA).

Firas Dibs, Press Spokesperson for the Jerusalem Islamic Foundations Administration, stated that the Israeli police attacked the Harem-i Sharif community.

Dibs pointed out that there was a dispute and friction between Palestinian youth and Israeli police in front of the Al-Maqariba (Moroccans) Gate in the south west of Al-Aqsa Mosque, and emphasized that the police intervened with sound bombs and rubber bullets.

On 24 May 2021, the Temple Mount complex was reopened to Jews for the first time in 20 days after Muslim unrest.

Sealed gates
The wall surrounding the Temple Mount contains six sealed gates.

Golden Gate

The Golden Gate ("Gate of Mercy"), located on the eastern wall of the Temple Mount, was probably built in the 520s CE, as part of Justinian I's building program in Jerusalem, on top of the ruins of an earlier gate in the wall.  An alternate theory holds that it was built in the later part of the 7th century by Byzantine artisans employed by the Umayyad khalifs. It has two vaulted halls which lead to the Door of Mercy, Bab al-Rahma, and the Door of Repentance, Bab al-Taubah. Closed by the Muslims in 810, reopened in 1102 by the Crusaders, it was walled up by Saladin after regaining Jerusalem in 1187. Suleiman the Magnificent rebuilt it together with the city walls, but walled it up in 1541, and it has stayed that way until today. The 1st-century historian, Josephus, who mentions the "eastern gate" in his Antiquities,  makes note of the fact that this gate was considered within the far northeastern extremity of the inner sacred court. According to the Mishnah, there was formerly a causeway which led out of the Temple Mount eastward over the Kidron Valley, extending as far as the Mount of Olives. Rabbi Eliezer, dissenting, says that it was not a causeway, but rather marble pillars over which cedar boards had been laid, used by the High Priest and his entourage. This gate was not used by the masses to enter the Temple Mount, but reserved only for the High Priest and all those that aided him when taking out the Red Heifer or the scapegoat on the Day of Atonement.

Dutch archaeologist Leen Ritmeyer, who explored the gate in the 1970s, reached the conclusion that the two monolithic massive gateposts seen on the inside of the gate belong to an old structure of the gate, thought to be the Shushan Gate (mentioned in Mishnah Middot 1:3 as being the only gate in the Eastern Wall), and that it dates from the First Temple period.

During the Ottoman-Turk era, the inner recess (vestibule) built within the western side of the Golden Gate was used for brick burning, which bricks were then used to renovate buildings and structures in the Haram esh-Sharif (Temple Mount enclosure). A small mosque was built near the Golden Gate to cater to the brick burners, but which was later destroyed, along with part of the Gate's wall, by order of the Sultan in the 19th-century in order to make room for renovations. A new wall and two new arches were added to the Gate's western interior. The gate house, which is accessed from the Temple Mount by descending a wide flight of stairs leading into it, and where the current ground floor is built in the shape of a rectangle measuring  ×  (exterior wall measurements), is surrounded by walls, the length of which space is divided by a row of columns forming two equal divisions. At the ground level can be seen the top of an ancient arch (the lower stones still buried underground), the existence of which leads to the conclusion that the original ground level was much lower than what it is today.

Warren's Gate

Hittah Gate/Barclay's Gate

Barclay's Gate lies within the Al-Buraq Mosque, under the Moroccans' Gate (Moors' Gate) and is one of the four Al-Masjid Al-Aqsa original gates on its western side. It is named after James Turner Barclay, a 19th-century Christian missionary who discovered the main structure of the gate buried underground within the Al-Aqsa compound in 1852. Several researchers identified it as one of the Second Temple period gates, possibly the Coponius Gate, which is mentioned in Jewish and Christian sources of the period. The gate was blocked with stones at the end of the 10th century and the internal gate room was transformed into a mosque dedicated to Buraq. Today the room is closed and entrance to it is prohibited without the approval of the Waqf.

After the Six-Day War, the Israel Religious Affairs Ministry and Benjamin Mazar, who was at the time conducting the dig outside the southern wall of the Temple Mount, planned to uncover this gate, but they were prevented from doing so by both Jewish and Muslim religious leaders.

Huldah Gates

The Huldah Gates comprise two sets of bricked-up gates in the southern wall of the Temple Mount.
The fact that the original entrance gateways still exist reflects an ancient promise cited in a work of rabbinic literature, Shir ha-Shirim Rabbah: "The Kohen Gate and the Huldah Gate were never destroyed and God will renew them". The 1st-century historian, Josephus, mentions these gates in his Antiquities: "...the fourth front of the temple [mount], which was southward, had indeed itself gates in its middle."

The Double Gate/ The Prophets Gate/ Bab Al Nabi
The Prophets Gate or the Double Gate is one of the permanently closed gates along the Southern wall of Al Aqsa Compound. The Gate was used by the Umayyad Caliphs when they would visit Al Aqsa Mosque from their palaces to the south of the compound.  

This gate is located around 100 metres from the South Western corner of the Compound. According to Khusru, Bab al Nabi was named as such because it was believed to be the place that the Prophet Muhammed entered Al Aqsa on the night of Isra and Miraj. Since the 19th Century according to Ratrout, the name “Double Gate” was given due to the two rectangular doorways which opened up into the long tunnel leading to the “Ancient Mosque” or “Al Aqsa Qadeem”. The Gateway enters into a long tunnel which measures more than 77 metres towards the north from the Southern wall. On the side of the doorways, above the arch there are floral engravings which according to Ben-Dov 1985, p138 is an “arch in the style of the Muslim Period”

According to Ratrout, p256, Bab Al Nabi leads to a square domed vestibule which then leads to a flight of stairs leading to a double passage tunnel up to the level of the compound. The tunnel according to Ratrout during the early Islamic Period was much shorter but was extended to the north by the Abbasid Caliphs Al Mansur and Al Mahdi in 154-163 AH/ 771-780 AD [Hamilton, 1949, p63]

Triple Gate
The set on the right is a triple-arched gate, known as the Triple Gate - not to be confused with Barclay's Gate, which has the same Arabic name. Each of the gates once led into a passageway stretching underneath the esplanade of the Mount, and then to steps leading up to the esplanade itself.

Single Gate
The Single Gate is located along the southern wall. It once led to the underground area of the Temple Mount known as Solomon's Stables.

Gate of the Funerals, or of the Burāq

See also
 Temple Mount entry restrictions
 Southern Wall
 Walls of Jerusalem

References

External links
 

Temple Mount
Gates
Temple Mount